This is a partial list of novae in the Milky Way galaxy that have been discovered and recorded since 1891. Novae are stars that undergo dramatic explosions, but unlike supernovae, these do not result in the destruction of the original star. The likely rate of novae in the Milky Way is about 40 per year, but of these only about 10 per year are discovered by observers as of the 2000s (decade). This list attempts to include only the brighter or more notable novae.

The Central Bureau for Astronomical Telegrams (CBAT) maintains a more complete list of novae in the Milky Way since 1612.

For a list of novae in individual years, see instead: novae in 2018, novae in 2019.

Nomenclature
Novae are initially designated via a "Nova [genitive form of constellation name] [year of discovery]" format, e.g. "Nova Cygni 1974" and "Nova Scorpii 2010". An official permanent name is usually soon assigned by the General Catalog of Variable Stars using the GCVS format for the naming of variable stars. When more than one nova is discovered in a constellation in one year, a numeric suffix is appended; hence "Nova Sagittarii 2011 #2", "Nova Sagitarii 2011 #3", etc.

See also 
 List of supernovae
 Variable star

Notes

References

External links
 CBAT List of Novae in the Milky Way

Milky Way
Milky Way
Novae in the Milky Way
Novae